Kevin Holness (born September 25, 1971) is a former Canadian international soccer player.

Club career
Holness spent his entire outdoor soccer career in Canada, playing for Winnipeg Fury, Toronto Blizzard, Montreal Impact, Toronto Lynx, Vancouver 86ers and Vancouver Whitecaps FC.

Also, Holness played indoor soccer with Toronto Shooting Stars, Wichita Wings and most prominently with Edmonton Drillers in the NPSL.

International career
Holness played in all three of Canada's games at the 1987 FIFA U-16 World Championship which were held in Canada. He played there in a team also featuring Paul Peschisolido and Carl Fletcher.

He made senior his debut for Canada in a May 1995 Canada Cup match against Northern Ireland and earned a total of 9 caps, scoring 2 goals, both against Honduras at the 1996 CONCACAF Gold Cup. His final international was a June 1996 friendly match against Costa Rica.

International goals
Scores and results list Canada's goal tally first.

Coaching career
Holness was the inaugural coach of the Saskatoon Accelerators of the Canadian Major Indoor Soccer League before resigning prior to the start of the 2009/2010 season. Holness is also the head technical director for AC Futbol Club in Regina, Saskatchewan.

References

External links
Reginan named coach Canada.com

1971 births
Living people
Sportspeople from Kingston, Jamaica
Jamaican emigrants to Canada
Naturalized citizens of Canada
Black Canadian soccer players
Canadian soccer players
Canada men's youth international soccer players
Canada men's under-23 international soccer players
Canada men's international soccer players
Winnipeg Fury players
Toronto Blizzard (1986–1993) players
Montreal Impact (1992–2011) players
Toronto Lynx players
Vancouver Whitecaps (1986–2010) players
Wichita Wings (NPSL) players
Toronto Shooting Stars players
Edmonton Drillers (1996–2000) players
Canadian Soccer League (1987–1992) players
National Professional Soccer League (1984–2001) players
Canadian soccer coaches
American Professional Soccer League players
A-League (1995–2004) players
1996 CONCACAF Gold Cup players
Association football midfielders
Langara College people